The Telecom Italia Tower is a 129-metre high skyscraper located in the business district of Naples, Italy. It is currently the ninth tallest skyscraper in Italy. It was, for 15 years, the highest building in Italy, surpassing by 2 meters the Pirelli Tower in Milan, that held the title from 1960 to 1995.

Description 
The complex consists of a central tower and two low rises that surrounding it. It is covered in mirrored glass on all sides.

Front has two pylons lined white panels that comprise the body of the elevators and stairs. By the middle is placed a panoramic balcony that looks like a black horizontal cut on the front, but often do not notice because it is a little higher up the roof of the body low. This feature is also present in two other places in the tower back up, almost at the top, occupying almost the whole plan, and always back to the same position on the façade of the overview, or the middle of the skyscraper.

Watching the sides of the tower, you notice another peculiarity of the structure, or the indentations in glass and different levels of the roof in these sides. It is visible from the surrounding hills and from different parts of town, port and the Napoli Centrale railway station.

See also 
 Telecom Italia
 List of tallest buildings in Naples
 Centro direzionale di Napoli

References 

Skyscrapers in Naples
Skyscraper office buildings in Italy
Office buildings completed in 1994
1994 establishments in Italy